Hamit Hüsnü Kayacan (1868, Kadıköy, Istanbul – 1952, Istanbul) was a Turkish intellectual and sports executive, who played a major role in the development of football in Turkey. He was the older brother of Fuat Hüsnü Kayacan. Being one of the principal founders of Galatasaray SK, he left the club after a disagreement with the Galatasaray board members and switched to Fenerbahçe SK which he also served as a president.

References

1868 births
1952 deaths
Fenerbahçe S.K. presidents
Sportspeople from Istanbul
Turkish sports businesspeople